The Committee for Academic Freedom in Africa (CAFA) was an organisation set up in light of the struggles in the universities consequent to the implementation of the Structural Adjustment Programme (SAP).

The organisation was founded by Silvia Federici and George Caffentzis in the 1980s. They took on the role of coordinators and produced their first newsletter in spring 1991. and were later joined by Ousseina Alidou, Alamin Mazrui, Andrew Nash and Nigel Gibson.

CAFA was involved in the publication of A Thousand Flowers which chronicles this struggle through the 1980s and 1990s.

Sponsors
Alongside Caffentzis and Frederici, an initial list of sponsors was published in issue 2 of the newsletter, with additional sponsors added later:
 Dennis Brutus
 Harry Cleaver
 Peter Linebaugh
 Manning Marable
 Nancy Murray
 Marcus Rediker
 Gayatri Spivak
 Immanuel Wallerstein
From fall 1992:
 Julius Ihonvbere
From spring 1993:
 Horace Campbell
From fall 1993
 Jon Kraus:
From spring 1994:
 Alamin Mazrui
 Lupenga Mphande
From spring 1996:
 Emmanuel Eze
From spring 1997:
 Mario Fenyo
From fall 1997:
 Cheryl Mwaria

References

Academic freedom
Education in Africa